Big Money Item is an album by the American power pop band the Greenberry Woods, released in 1995. The band broke up two weeks after its release. The album's first single was "Super Geek".

Production
The album was produced by Andy Paley. The songwriting was equally divided among guitar players Matt and Brandt Huseman and bass player Ira Katz.

Critical reception

Trouser Press called Big Money Item "superb stuff, but overly derivative." The Baltimore Sun thought that it "boasts enough beautiful minor-key melodies and lush, soaring harmonies to put any listener in mind of Rubber Soul and Revolver." The Record opined that "the quartet makes affecting, careful pop look so effortless that it's easy to underestimate their tremendous accomplishment."

The St. Petersburg Times  wrote: "Like Squeeze and Crowded House at their least self-indulgent, the Beach Boys sans their one-trick-pony musical clichés, the Posies fulfilling their early promise, Badfinger with jangly optimism, Pezband with decent songs—this disc sounds as timeless and classic as anything you'll hear recorded today." The Calgary Herald stated that "the Woods jangle and harmonize through 18 condensed gems in 50 minutes." The Contra Costa Times declared that "the Greenberry Woods have tapped into some kind of long-forgotten genius on Big Money Item ... this is an album so clear-headed and upbeat that you're blown backwards with joy."

AllMusic wrote that "even at its most superficial and derivative and unapologetically nerdy, Big Money Item is just so chock full of fatal hooks that ... well ... life almost starts to feel that fresh and innocent again."

Track listing

References

1995 albums
Sire Records albums